|}

The Sweet Mimosa Stakes is a Listed flat horse race in Ireland open to fillies and mares aged three years and over.
It is run at Naas over a distance of 6 furlongs (1,206 metres), and it is scheduled to take place each year in July.

The race was first run in 2003.  It was run at Leopardstown until 2007, and at the Curragh in 2008 and 2009. It is currently sponsored by the Yeomanstown Stud.

Records

Leading jockey (3 wins):
Johnny Murtagh – Elletelle (2008), Bewitched (2010), Miss Lahar (2013)
Billy Lee – Katia (2011), Fort Del Oro (2016), Sonaiyla (2020)
Gary Carroll -   Only Mine (2017), Wren's Breath (2021), Pirate Jenny (2022) 

Leading trainer (2 wins):
 Kevin Prendergast  – Ulfah (2004), Evening Time (2007)
 Ger Lyons -  Elletelle (2008), Pirate Jenny (2022)

Winners

See also
 Horse racing in Ireland
 List of Irish flat horse races

References
Racing Post: 

Flat races in Ireland
Sprint category horse races for fillies and mares
Naas Racecourse
Recurring sporting events established in 2003
2003 establishments in Ireland